Donald Dinnie McCorkindale (16 August 1904 – 11 August 1970) was a South African boxer who competed in the 1928 Summer Olympics. He fought as Don McCorkindale.

Biography
He was born in Pretoria, Transvaal Colony and died in Edenvale, Guateng.

McCorkindale won the Amateur Boxing Association of England 1926 light heavyweight title. Two years later in 1928 he finished fourth in the light heavyweight class at the 1928 Summer Olympics, after losing the bronze medal bout to Karel Miljon.

1928 Olympic results
Below are the results of Don McCorkindale, a South African light heavyweight boxer who competed in the 1928 Amsterdam Olympics:

 Round of 16: defeated Domenico Ceccarelli (Italy) on points
 Quarterfinal: defeated Juozas Vinca (Lithuania) by second-round knockout
 Semifinal: lost to Victor Avendano (Argentina) on points
 Bronze Medal Match: lost to Karel Miljin (Netherlands) on points

References

 sports-reference.com

1904 births
1970 deaths
Sportspeople from Pretoria
Transvaal Colony people
Light-heavyweight boxers
Olympic boxers of South Africa
Boxers at the 1928 Summer Olympics
South African people of Scottish descent
South African male boxers